The 1997 European Curling Championships were held from December 6 to 13 at the Bundesleistungszentrum in Füssen, Germany.

Men's

A Tournament

Group A

Group B

B Tournament

Group A

Playoffs

Women's

Group A

Group B

B Tournament

Group A

Playoffs

References

European Curling Championships, 1997
European Curling Championships, 1997
European Curling Championships
European Curling Championships, 1997
International curling competitions hosted by Germany
European Curling Championships, 1997
European Curling Championships, 1997